Pickens, Arkansas may refer to:
Pickens, Desha County, Arkansas, an unincorporated community in Desha County
Pickens, White County, Arkansas, an unincorporated community in White County